Jacques Francken (1891 – 1949) was a Dutch male footballer. He was part of the Netherlands national football team, playing 1 match and scoring 1 goal on 15 March 1914. On club level he played for HFC..

His brothers Harry, Mannes and Peddy Francken also played for HFC.

See also
 List of Dutch international footballers

References

Inez Hollander, Silenced Voices: Uncovering a Family's Colonial History in Indonesia, Ohio University Press, 2008,

External links
 
 

1891 births
1949 deaths
Dutch footballers
Netherlands international footballers
HFC Haarlem players
People from Jombang Regency
Association football forwards